Marana may refer to:

 Maraña, a village in León, Spain
 Maraṇa, the Pali/Sanskrit term for death
 Marana, Arizona, a town in Pima County, Arizona, United States
 Marana, Estonia, a village in Estonia
 Marana, Syria, a village in Syria
 Uva Marana, a synonym of the Italian wine grape Verdicchio
 Marana Regional Airport, an airport in Arizona, United States

See also 
 Marano (disambiguation)